Anthony Jomah Ballah (born 24 October 1979, Lofa County) is a retired Liberian international footballer.

Career

Career in Indonesia
Ballah started his career in Indonesia with played for PSM Makassar in 1998. After that he played for some club in Indonesia start from Deltras Sidoarjo, PSIS Semarang, Persita Tangerang, Arema Malang, Persebaya Surabaya, PSIR Rembang and now he currently play for Persitema Temanggung. Persita Tangerang is the team's longest he strengthened his career in football in Indonesia starting from 2001 to 2004. And the greatest success in his career in Indonesia was when he made Arema Malang won Piala Indonesia in the 2006 season.

International career
He started his career with Liberia national football team in 2004 and ended in 2007 with 3 international caps and no goals.

Honours

Clubs
Arema Malang :
Piala Indonesia Champions : 1 (2006)

References

External links

1979 births
Association football midfielders
Liberian expatriate footballers
Liberian expatriate sportspeople in Indonesia
Liberian footballers
Expatriate footballers in Indonesia
Liga 1 (Indonesia) players
Living people
Liberia international footballers
People from Lofa County
Persebaya Surabaya players
Persita Tangerang players
PSM Makassar players
Arema F.C. players
PSIR Rembang players
Deltras F.C. players
PSIS Semarang players